John Baptist Nosardy Zino was a 19th-century Roman Catholic priest.

He was appointed the Vicar Apostolic of Gibraltar by Pope Pius VII on 25 January 1816. After holding the post for twenty-three years, he resigned the position in 1839.

References

Year of birth unknown
Year of death unknown
19th-century Roman Catholic bishops of Gibraltar